Andromache is a rural locality in the Whitsunday Region, Queensland, Australia.

History
Named after the Andromache River which first appears on a survey map of a route for a telegraph line from Bowen to Mackay drawn in late 1864 by surveyor and entrepreneur T.H. Fitzgerald. It is possible he gave the name. Andromache was the wife of the legendary Greek hero, Hector.

Andromache Provisional School opened circa 1891 and closed circa 1893.

Andromache River Prosivional School opened in In 1927 and closed in 1928.

References

Whitsunday Region
Localities in Queensland